The 2011 Baku Cup was a professional tennis tournament played on hard courts. It was the first edition of the Baku Cup which was part of the 2011 WTA Tour. It took place in Baku, Azerbaijan between 18 and 24 July 2011.

WTA entrants

Seeds

Rankings are as of July 11, 2011.

Other entrants
The following players received wildcards into the singles main draw:
  Nigina Abduraimova
  Kamilla Farhad 
  Nina Khrisanova

The following players received entry from the qualifying draw:

  Elena Bovina
  Yana Buchina
  Eirini Georgatou
  Valeria Solovieva

The following players received entry from a lucky loser spot:
  Tatia Mikadze

Champions

Singles

 Vera Zvonareva def.  Ksenia Pervak, 6–1, 6–4.
It was Zvonareva's second title of the year and 12th of her career.

Doubles

 Mariya Koryttseva /  Tatiana Poutchek def.  Monica Niculescu /  Galina Voskoboeva, 6–3, 2–6, [10–8].

References

External links
Official Website

2011 in Azerbaijani sport
Baku Cup
Baku Cup